Enoch Wedgwood (1813-1879) was an English potter, founder in 1860 of the pottery firm Wedgwood & Co of Tunstall, Stoke-on-Trent.  He was a distant cousin of the famous potter Josiah Wedgwood, of Josiah Wedgwood & Sons but their two businesses were separate concerns.

Wedgwood married Jane Mattinson (1814-1880) in 1837.  They had four children, one of whom died in infancy:

 Edmund Mattinson Wedgwood (1840-1904), potter.
 Charlotte (1843-?)
 Alfred Joseph Wedgwood  (1845-1846) died in infancy.
 Alfred Enoch Wedgwood (1850-1894), potter.

Enoch Wedgwood became a partner in the firm of Podmore Walker & Co, originally founded in 1834 by Thomas Podmore (1791-1860) & Thomas Walker of Tunstall. Following the death of Thomas Podmore in 1860, Enoch Wedgwood inherited a share in the interests of the business left to him by Podmore. The firm carried in under the name of Wedgwood & Co. In later years Wedgwood & Co was renamed Enoch Wedgwood (Tunstall) Ltd in 1965 and in 1980 it was taken over by Josiah Wedgwood & Sons, who renamed it Unicorn Pottery.

External links 
 http://www.thepotteries.org/allpotters/1061a.htm
 https://web.archive.org/web/20091020062514/http://geocities.com/Heartland/3203/WmIII.html

1813 births
1879 deaths
English potters
People from Tunstall, Staffordshire